Aazaan is a 2011 Indian Hindi-language action thriller film directed by Prashant Chadha, starring Sachiin J. Joshi and South African model Candice Boucher. Aazaan marks the debut of entrepreneur-turned-actor Sachiin J Joshi of Energy Drinks and Candice Boucher who was seen in the title role.

Plot
The film begins with a suicide bombing attack in Germany at a peace conference where Indian Home Minister (Sachin Khedekar) is affected by an unknown virus. In RAW headquarters, menon (Sarita Choudhury) joins the investigation. RAW HQ is threatened by a threat who calls himself Doctor. In HQ, army officer Aazaan Khan (Sachiin J. Joshi) is interrogated about the case because of his brother's, Aman Khan, involvement as a terrorist in the suicide bombings.

Aazaan is deployed in Waziristan to infiltrate the enemy force and to find the whereabouts of his brother. He travels from country to country to find the culprits and even becomes one of them to gain their confidence. Aazaan comes across two Pakistanis from whom he soon finds the whereabouts of the kingpin, the Doctor. The Doctor has taken hold of Mahfouz (Dalip Tahil) and has seized the cure for the virus from him, so now he has both the weapon and its antidote. He knows that Aazaan is with the cops, and both are led to be killed in the market square. Aazaan breaks free and tries to rescue the scientist, but it's too late. Before being detonated by a strapped bomb, he tells Aazaan to find a sand artist in Morocco and a girl with her, as they have the cure for the virus.

Aazaan escapes and runs to Morocco, where he finds the sand artist Aafreen, who is taking care of an orphaned girl. Aafreen knows about Aazaan and his missing brother Aman. Soon both fall in love. But the terrorists follow Aazaan in Morocco too, and the three of them decide to escape to India at the earliest so that the child's blood can be used to make a cure for the virus in India.

As they are waiting for Sam Sharma to turn up in the chopper, Aazaan, Aafreen, and the girl face a rude shock when Sam pulls out a gun and shoots Aafreen. The child is forcefully taken away, and Aazaan is captured and led away. Apparently, Sam was a traitor working on the side of the Doctor. Aazaan sacrifices his life to save the girl and throws her off in a parachute. Aazaan dies and saves the world from the virus as the government now gets the antidote.

Cast
Sachiin J. Joshi as Aazaan Khan: half Afghan and half Indian, he gets drawn into an espionage to find his younger brother a suspected terrorist. He is a young army officer and working for RAW (India's Research and Analysis Wing). Sachiin trained in Krav maga and Kalaripayatu for his role.
Dalip Tahil as Mahfouz: He is a savant on a mission and is trying to save the world from being destroyed by Doctor.
Candice Boucher as Afreen: She is a sand artist, and she grounds Aazaan with love. Prashant had known Candice for four years and found her perfect for the role of a Moroccan girl. Acclaimed sand artist Alexandra Konofalskaya from Belarus was hired to train her for her role in the film.
Aarya Babbar as Imaad: He is a misled, passionate man.
Alyy Khan as Sam Sharma
Ravi Kissen as Pandey: A controversial RAW officer.
Sachin Khedekar as Home Minister
Sajid Hassan as Doctor: He is ex-CIA and into biological warfare and is determined to carry out the absolute annihilation of India.
 Samy Gharbi as Malak: He is tough from the inside out and loyal to Doctor.
Vijayendra Ghatge as Home Minister
Sarita Choudhury as Menon
Amber Rose Revah as Sofiya: Prashant saw her role in From Paris With Love and sent her the script of Aazaan. Being part Polish, he found her perfect for the role, although she had never worked in any Polish films.
Neet Mohan as Aman Khan
Prashant Prabhakar as The Indian man (Raw Agent)

Production

Pre-production
Cinematographer Axel Fischer BVK was called for the cinematography of the film due to his experience in the field for action-thrillers. Former Playboy cover-girl Candice Boucher was signed as the lead actress opposite Sachiin J Joshi, who would be playing a sand artist in the film. Amber Rose of From Paris With Love fame will be starring alongside. Amitabh Shukla and Humphrey Dixon were signed as the editor.

The international action company Action Concept was given the work to direct the action stunts since the film involved shooting on multiple foreign locations.

Filming
Filming took place at multiple locations like Morocco, Hong Kong, Algeria, Poland (Kraków), France, Germany and India. The climax was shot in Chechnya, Russia. Azaan is the first film to be shot in Chechnya after it became an ecological disaster zone, with oil and chemical leaking into the ground and radioactive material left lying about.

The shooting was scheduled in these countries for 70 days which included many local cast to add the genuine look to Aazaan. During the shoot for a torture scene in Marrakech, Morocco, Sachiin went bare-bodied for hours at a stretch at a temperature of 0 to −4 Celsius impressing the production crew. Alvernia Studios in Poland handled the physical production work including camera, light and music score recording.

Some of the action scenes were shot in Bangkok, including stunts in which Sachiin Joshi jumped from a 55-storey tower. Some climax shots were shot by director Prashant Chadha with the rest of the cast, including Ravi Kissen and Arya Babbar.

Post-production
The Digital Intermediate and VFX of Aazaan was done by Pixion Studios.

Accidents
 It was reported that Sachiin got injured when filming a scene where he had to lay down with a sniper and got hit next to his eye.
 Sachiin fell off a trailer crash scene. The stunt involved Sachiin jumping off a speeding trailer but fell off much before the marking point and hit the footpath. "We all saw him jump off the trailer and hit the road hard, but it all happened so fast that we couldn't do much. Though Sachiin didn't call it a day, after some pain killers, he was back on the sets," said the director about the accident.

Release
The first look of Aazaan was unveiled at Festival de Cannes 2011 and received an overwhelming response.

The film was released on 14 October 2011.

Reception
Aazaan received mixed response from critics, praising it for its polishing and music although it was a boxoffice disaster. Nikhat Kazmi of Times of India gave the film a 3 star rating out of five praising its shoot-outs, action sequences and cinematography. IBNLive called it a movie with no content but high on style, pointing out flaws in the film's script. Subhash K. Jha of NDTV gave a -star rating out of five, praising its screenplay, and said, "Aazaan is not a film which wastes time in self-congratulation after staging one more terrorist explosion. It moves on relentlessly. The world has to be saved. Self-importance is miraculously averted."

Patcy N. of Rediff movies gave the film 1 star out of five calling it a jerky ride and a wasted effort. Komal Nahta, a well-known critic, also gave a single star criticising its confusing screenplay, the performance of the new hero and the unconvincing climax. Movie Talkies gave the film 1.5 stars calling it 'Aazaan, A Recipe For Disaster'.

Music

The music for Aazaan is given by the duo of Salim–Sulaiman, is under the Xtreme Music label, and was launched by Sanjay Dutt. On IIFA Rocks the duo of Salim-Sulaiman showcased the first exclusive preview of Aazaan music performing live with host of dancers from the Shiamak Davar Institute of Performing Arts. Three songs – 'Afreen', 'Bismillah' and 'Khuda Ke Liye' – were performed.

Audio listing

Reception
The music of Aazaan was received warmly. Bolywoodhungama.com praised the vocals of Rahat Fateh Ali Khan and listed 'Afreen' and 'Khuda Ke Liye' as their best pick from the listing, awarding the album an overall of three stars out of five.

Accolades

Controversy
 A group of people have filed a case against the film that it has the potential of hurting the religious sentiments of a specific community and thus Aazaan should be banned, demanding a change of title.
 Another problem emerged with the Censor Board of China for depicting the country as India's main enemy. As a result, the word China was muted out in the film.
 After Tamil film 7 aum arivu and Hollywood film crazies it was the third film in which china was shown as the villain

References

External links

2011 films
Indian action thriller films
2010s spy thriller films
Indian spy thriller films
2010s Hindi-language films
Films shot in Poland
2011 action thriller films
Films about the Research and Analysis Wing
Hindi-language action films